Ingeborg Eriksdotter ( – 17 June 1254) was a Swedish princess and duchess, daughter of King Eric X of Sweden, eldest sibling of King Eric XI of Sweden, wife of Birger Jarl, and mother of Kings Valdemar and Magnus III of Sweden.

Biography 
Ingeborg was born the eldest daughter of King Eric X of Sweden and his wife Richeza of Denmark. She lived during her youth in exile in Denmark after her brother had been deposed by his guardian and regent in 1229.

Ingeborg's marital engagement took place about 1234, in connection with her brother Eric XI reacquiring the Swedish throne from the usurper Canute II of Sweden, so that she and Eric could have the mighty House of Bjelbo as their ally.

Princess Ingeborg bore a vast number of children to her husband Duke Birger Jarl. In 1250, her brother died without heirs and her eldest son Valdemar was chosen to succeed Eric on the throne. Valdemar was chosen because he was her son, and her husband was made regent during his minority. Ingeborg thus became King's Mother and first lady of the royal court.

Ingeborg is recorded to have inherited her brother Eric's private property upon his death, as his only living sibling. Even in her forties, she continued to give birth to children, and her death is believed to have occurred because of childbirth complications, possibly giving birth to twins.

Children
The following children survived to adulthood:

 Richeza, born 1238, married first in 1251 Haakon Haakonsson the Young, co-king of Norway, and second Henry I, Prince of Werle
 Valdemar, born c 1238, King of Sweden 1250–1275, lord of parts of Gothenland until 1278
 Christina, married presumably several times, one of her husbands was Lord Sigge Guttormsson
 Magnus, born 1240, Duke of Södermanland, then King of Sweden 1275-90
 probably: Catherine, born 1245, married Siegfried, Count of Anhalt
 Eric, born 1250, Duke of Sweden and the Smallands
 probably: Ingeborg, born circa 1254, died 30 June 1302, married John I of Saxony, Duke of Lauenburg in 1270
 Benedict, born 1254, Duke of Finland and Bishop of Linköping

References 
 Cronica Principum Saxonie, MGH SS XXV, p. 476
 

1212 births
1254 deaths
Ingeborg 1212
Deaths in childbirth
Christians of the Second Swedish Crusade
House of Eric
House of Bjelbo
13th-century Swedish people
13th-century Swedish women
Daughters of kings